In Greek mythology, Tragasus (Ancient Greek: Τράγασος) or Cragasus (Κράγασος) was the father of Philonome, the deceitful wife of Cycnus.

Mythology 
The name Tragasus may be connected with the Tragasaean salt-pan near Hamaxitus, mentioned by Strabo, which was located south of Troy. Stephanus of Byzantium mentions Tragasus as the eponym of Tragasae in Troad, and adds that Poseidon was believed to once have done him a favor by turning the sea water into solid matter. The connection between him and the placename is also confirmed in the Etymologicum Magnum.

Notes

References 
 Pausanias, Description of Greece with an English Translation by W.H.S. Jones, Litt.D., and H.A. Ormerod, M.A., in 4 Volumes. Cambridge, MA, Harvard University Press; London, William Heinemann Ltd. 1918. Online version at the Perseus Digital Library
 Pausanias, Graeciae Descriptio. 3 vols. Leipzig, Teubner. 1903.  Greek text available at the Perseus Digital Library.
 Pseudo-Apollodorus, The Library with an English Translation by Sir James George Frazer, F.B.A., F.R.S. in 2 Volumes, Cambridge, MA, Harvard University Press; London, William Heinemann Ltd. 1921. Online version at the Perseus Digital Library. Greek text available from the same website.
 Stephanus of Byzantium, Stephani Byzantii Ethnicorum quae supersunt, edited by August Meineike (1790-1870), published 1849. A few entries from this important ancient handbook of place names have been translated by Brady Kiesling. Online version at the Topos Text Project.
 Strabo, The Geography of Strabo. Edition by H.L. Jones. Cambridge, Mass.: Harvard University Press; London: William Heinemann, Ltd. 1924. Online version at the Perseus Digital Library.
 Strabo, Geographica edited by A. Meineke. Leipzig: Teubner. 1877. Greek text available at the Perseus Digital Library.

Greek mythology of Anatolia
Characters in Greek mythology